This is a list of the first women lawyer(s) and judge(s) in North America (a separate list is devoted to the United States). It includes the year in which the women were admitted to practice law (in parentheses). Also included are the first women in their country to achieve a certain distinction such as graduating from law school.

KEY
 DNK = Constituent country of Denmark
FRA = Administrative division of France
 GBR = British overseas territory of the United Kingdom
NLD = Constituent country of the Netherlands
 USA = Associate state or territory of the United States of America

Anguilla (GBR) 
Arlene Magdalene Fraites-Gomez (1962): First female lawyer called to the Bar of St. Kitts and Nevis (then St. Kitts, Nevis and Anguilla)Monica Theresa Joseph: First female appointed as a Justice of the Eastern Caribbean Supreme Court (1982)Birnie Stephenson-Brooks: First female to serve as President of the Anguilla Bar Association (1996)Nicole Sylvester: First female to serve as the President of the Organization of Eastern Caribbean States (OECS) Bar Association (c. 2007)Janice Pereira (British Virgin Islands, 1981): First female (and British Virgin Islander) justice appointed as the Chief Justice of the Eastern Caribbean Supreme Court (2012)

Antigua and Barbuda 
Florence Lake (1960): First female lawyer in Antigua and BarbudaBernice Lake (1969): First female to become a Queen's Counsel (QC) in the Eastern Caribbean (Antigua; 1987)Monica Theresa Joseph: First female appointed as a Justice of the Eastern Caribbean Supreme Court (1982)E. Ann Henry: First female to serve as the President of the Antigua and Barbuda Bar Association (c. 1996)Gertel Thom (1982): First female lawyer to become Attorney-General of Antigua and Barbuda (1998-2001)Nicole Sylvester: First female to serve as the President of the Organization of Eastern Caribbean States (OECS) Bar Association (c. 2007)Janice Pereira (British Virgin Islands, 1981): First female (and British Virgin Islander) justice appointed as the Chief Justice of the Eastern Caribbean Supreme Court (2012)

Aruba (NLD) 

Dorothée de Sampayo: First female Magistrate of the Court of Justice of the Netherlands Antilles (1982-1986). She later became the first female Registrar of the International Criminal Tribunal for the former Yugoslavia. [Aruba]
Theresa Croes-Fernandes Pedra: First Aruban (female) to serve as a Judge of the Common Court of Justice of the Netherlands Antilles and Aruba (1995)
Lisbeth Hoefdraad: First female appointed as the President of the Common Court of Justice of the Antilles and Aruba (2007-2013) [now called the Joint Court of Justice of Aruba, Curaçao, Sint Maarten, and of Bonaire, Sint Eustatius and Saba]
 Gisèle Veen-Jonkhout: First female Public Prosecutor of the Netherlands Antilles (2010)
 : First female elected as the Dean of the Aruban Bar Association

Bahamas 

Patricia Cole Cozzi (1953): First female lawyer in The Bahamas
Janet Bostwick (1971): First female lawyer to become the Attorney General of The Bahamas (1995-2001). She was also the first female to serve as the President of The Bahamas Bar Association (1980).
Joan Sawyer (1973): First female judge in The Bahamas (1988). She was also the first female justice appointed as the Chief Justice of The Bahamas (1996-2001) and the President of the Court of Appeal of the Bahamas (2001-2010).
Allyson Maynard Gibson: First female Queen's Counsel (QC) in The Bahamas (2015)

Barbados 

 Marie Elizabeth Bourne-Hollands (1947): First female to practice law in Barbados
Norma E. Maynard-Marshall (1962): First female solicitor in Barbados
Billie Miller (1969): First female barrister in Barbados
Marie McCormack (1971): First female judge (1971) and Judge of the High Court (1995) in Barbados
Shirley Bell (1972): First female to serve as a Chief Magistrate in Barbados (1991)
Sandra Mason (1975): First Barbadian woman admitted to the Barbados Bar Association. She was the first female appointed as a Judge of the Court of Appeal (2008), as well as the first female magistrate appointed as an Ambassador from Barbados.
Beverley Walrond (1974): First female to serve as the President of the Barbados Bar Association
Kaye Goodridge: First female to serve as the Solicitor General of Barbados (1996)
Mia Mottley (1986): First female appointed as the Attorney General of Barbados (2001)
Donna Babb-Agard: First female appointed as deputy director of Public Prosecutions in Barbados (2005)

Belize 

Hadie Goldson: First female lawyer in Belize
 Zoila Ellis-Browne: First Garifuna female lawyer in Belize
Michelle Arana: First female judge in Belize (upon becoming a Judge of the Supreme Court of Belize in 2006)
Monica Coc Magnusson: First indigenous (Qʼeqchiʼ) female from southern Belize called to the Belize Bar Association
 Vanessa Retreage: First female appointed as the Attorney General of Belize (2015)
Lisa Shoman (1988): First female appointed as a Judge of the Inter-American Development Bank's Tribunal (2017). She was also the first female to serve as the President of the Bar Association of Belize (1996).
Louise Blenman: First female to serve as the Chief Justice of the Supreme Court of Belize (2022)

Bermuda (GBR) 

Lois Browne-Evans (1953): First female lawyer in Bermuda, as well as Bermuda's first female Attorney General (1999)
Priya De Soya: First female to become Crown Counsel in Bermuda (1976)
Dianna Kempe (1970): First female lawyer to become Queen's Counsel (QC) in Bermuda (2000)
 Norma Wade-Miller (1977): First female magistrate in Bermuda. She was also the first female Judge of the High Court, Justice of the Supreme Court of Bermuda and Acting Chief Justice in Bermuda.
 Patricia Dangor: First female to serve as a Judge of the Bermuda Court of Appeals (2014)
 Karen Williams-Smith: First Black female to serve as the President of the Bermuda Bar Association (2017)
 Cindy Clarke: First female to serve as the Director of Public Prosecutions in Bermuda (2020)

Bonaire (NLD) 

Dorothée de Sampayo: First female Magistrate of the Court of Justice of the Netherlands Antilles (1982-1986). She later became the first female Registrar of the International Criminal Tribunal for the former Yugoslavia. [Bonaire]
Lisbeth Hoefdraad: First female appointed as the President of the Common Court of Justice of the Antilles and Aruba (2007-2013) [now called the Joint Court of Justice of Aruba, Curaçao, Sint Maarten, and of Bonaire, Sint Eustatius and Saba]
Marga Domingo-Van Lieshout (2006): First female registered to practice law in the Order of Lawyers Bonaire (Orde van Advocaten van Bonaire; founded in 2004)
Gisèle Veen-Jonkhout: First female Public Prosecutor of the Netherlands Antilles (2010)

British Virgin Islands (GBR) 

Dancia Penn: First female lawyer in the British Virgin Islands. She became the first British Virgin Islander female to be appointed Attorney General of the British Virgin Islands in 1992.
Paula F. Beaubrun: First female Attorney General of the British Virgin Islands (c. 1970s)
Adriane J. Dudley: First female to serve as the President of the British Virgin Islands Bar Association (1980)
Monica Theresa Joseph: First female appointed as a Justice of the Eastern Caribbean Supreme Court (1982)
Nicole Sylvester: First female to serve as the President of the Organization of Eastern Caribbean States (OECS) Bar Association (c. 2007)
Janice Pereira (British Virgin Islands, 1981): First female (and British Virgin Islander) justice appointed as the Chief Justice of the Eastern Caribbean Supreme Court (2012)

Canada 

 Clara Brett Martin (1897): First female lawyer in Canada (upon being called to the Ontario Bar)
 Alice Jamieson and Emily Murphy: First female judges in Canada (Alberta; 1914–1916)
 Helen Kinnear (1920): First female appointed as a judge by the Government of Canada (1943). She was also the first female lawyer in the British Commonwealth to become a King's Counsel (1934) and to argue a case before the Supreme Court of Canada (1935) 
 Violet King Henry (1954): First Black female lawyer in Canada
 Constance Glube (1956): First female appointed as a Chief Justice in Canada (1982). She was also the first female appointed as a Justice of the Nova Scotia Supreme Court.
 Gabrielle Vallée (1954): First female appointed as the Associate Chief Justice of a Superior Court of Canada (1976)
 Réjane Laberge-Colas (1957): First female appointed as a Judge of the Superior Court in Canada (1969)
 Beverley McLachlin (1969): First female justice appointed as the Chief Justice of Canada (2000-2017). She was also the first female appointed as a Judge of the British Columbia Court of Appeal (1985) and Chief Justice of the British Columbia Supreme Court (1988).
 Marion Ironquil Meadmore (1977): First indigenous female lawyer in Canada
 Bertha Wilson (c. 1950s): First female appointed as a Justice of the Supreme Court in Canada (1982). She was also the first female to sit on the Ontario Court of Appeal in 1975.
Kim Campbell (1984): First female Attorney General of Canada (1990-1993)
Corrine Sparks: First Black female judge in Canada (upon her appointment as a Judge of the Nova Scotia Family Court in 1987)
Rose Boyko: First aboriginal woman appointed as a superior court judge in Canada (1994)
Vivene Salmon: First Black (female) President of the Canadian Bar Association (2019)

Cayman Islands (GBR) 

 Adrianne Webb (1975): First female lawyer in the Cayman Islands
 Theresa Lewis Pitcairn: First female to serve as the President of the Caymanian Bar Association (2001)
 Priya Levers: First female to serve as a Judge of the Cayman Islands Grand Court (2003)
Cheryll Richards: First (female) Director of Public Prosecutions for the Cayman Islands (2011). In 2010, Richards became the first female Queen's Counsel (QC) in the Cayman Islands.
Margaret Ramsay-Hale: First female to serve as the Chief Justice of the Cayman Islands (2022)

Costa Rica 

 Ángela Acuña Braun (c. 1925): First female lawyer in Costa Rica
Virginia Martén Pagés: First female lawyer to obtained the title of notary public in Costa Rica (1947)
Ofelia Vincenzi Peñaranda: First female to serve as a juvenile public defender in Costa Rica
 María Eugenia Vargas Solera: First female judge in Costa Rica (upon her appointment as a Judge of the Juvenile Protection of Costa Rica in 1956) 
Ana María Breedy Jalet: First female to serve as an Alternate Magistrate of the Supreme Court of Justice of Costa Rica (1975), as well as the first female to preside over the Full Court  
Sonia Picado Sotela: First (Costa Rican) female to serve as a Judge of the Inter-American Court of Human Rights (1989)  
Ana Virginia Calzada-Miranda: First female to serve as a magistrate of the Constitutional Chamber of the Supreme Court of Justice of Costa Rica (1993) and its President (2008)
 Maruja Chacón Pacheco: First female magistrate of the Supreme Electoral Court of Costa Rica (1997)
Anabelle León Feoli: First female justice appointed to the Presidency of the First Chamber of the Supreme Court of Justice of Costa Rica (2003)
Elizabeth Odio Benito: First Costa Rican female to serve as a Judge of the International Criminal Court (2003)
Éricka Hernández Sandoval: First female to serve as the President of the Costa Rican Bar Association (2009)
 Zarela Villanueva Monge (c. 1970s): First female Vice President (2010) and President of the Supreme Court of Justice of Costa Rica (2013)
 Doris Arias Madrigal: First female justice appointed to the Presidency of the Criminal Chamber of the Supreme Court of Justice of Costa Rica (2017)
 Emilia Navas: First female appointed as the Attorney General of Costa Rica (2018)

Cuba 

 Esperanza de Quesada Villalón: First female lawyer in Cuba (c. 1913)
Maria T. Ruiz y Rojas: First female judge in Cuba (c. 1926)
 Rosa Anders: First female appointed as a Public Defender in Cuba
 Sara Esther Fernández Concepción and Maria del Carmen Herrero Rodriguez: First females to serve as Judges of the People's Supreme Court of Cuba (1973)
 Zenaida Osorio Vizcaino: First female to serve as the Vice President of the People's Supreme Court of Cuba (c. 1998) 
 Yamila Peña Ojeda: First female to serve as the Attorney General of Cuba (2018)

Curaçao (NLD) 

Viola Antonia Geevers-Hollander (1946): First female lawyer in Curaçao
Adèle Pauline van der Pluijm-Vrede: First female to act as a civil-law notary in Curaçao (1994)
Lisbeth Hoefdraad: First female appointed as the President of the Common Court of Justice of the Antilles and Aruba (2007-2013) [now called the Joint Court of Justice of Aruba, Curaçao, Sint Maarten, and of Bonaire, Sint Eustatius and Saba]

Dominica 

 Mary Eugenia Charles (1949): First female lawyer in Dominica
Sylvia Judith Bertrand (1969): First female to serve as the Solicitor General of Dominica (1982)
 Monica Theresa Joseph: First female appointed as a Justice of the Eastern Caribbean Supreme Court (1982)
 Francine Baron Royer: First female to serve as the Attorney General of Dominica (2007)
 Nicole Sylvester: First female to serve as the President of the Organization of Eastern Caribbean States (OECS) Bar Association (c. 2007)
 Janice Pereira (British Virgin Islands, 1981): First female (and British Virgin Islander) justice appointed as the Chief Justice of the Eastern Caribbean Supreme Court (2012)
 Pearl Williams: First Kalinago (female) lawyer and indigenous magistrate in Dominica (2016)

Dominican Republic 

 Minerva Argentina Mirabal (c. 1940s): First female to graduate with a law degree in the Dominican Republic, but she was denied the right to practice as an attorney
 Ana Teresa Paredas: First female lawyer in the Dominican Republic
 Luisa Comarazamy de Los Santos: First female Justice of the Peace in the Dominican Republic (c. 1950s) 
Pura Luz Núñez Pérez and Semiramis Olivo de Pichardo: First females to serve as the Attorney General of the Dominican Republic (their terms were 1988-1990 respectively)
 Margarita Tavares Vidal (1947): First female appointed as a Justice of the Supreme Court of the Dominican Republic (1997) 
 Zoila Martínez (1967): First female appointed as Prosecutor of the National District in the Dominican Republic (1995) 
 Rhadys Abreu de Polanco: First Dominican Republic female elected as a Judge of the Inter-American Court of Human Rights of the Organization of American States (2006) 
 Olga Herrera Carbuccia: First Dominican Republic female elected as a Judge of the International Criminal Court (2011)
Ana Isabel Bonilla Hernandez and Katia Miguelina Jiménez Martínez: First females to serve as Judges of the Constitutional Court of the Dominican Republic (2011)
Nancy Idelsa Salcedo Fernández: First female appointed as a member of the National Council of the Magistracy (CNM) in the Dominican Republic (2020)

El Salvador 

 Alma Paredes Delgado: First El Salvadorean female to become a lawyer, though her studies were in Mexico and her other pursuits included journalism
 María García Herrera de Jovel (1944): First female to graduate as a lawyer in El Salvador
 Noemí Arias Avilés: First female appointed as a Judge of the First Instance in El Salvador (1959)
Yolanda Myers de Vásquez: First female to serve as a Magistrate of the Labor Chamber (1961) and the Attorney General of El Salvador (1967)
Ana "Anita" Calderón de Buitrago and Aronette Diaz: First females to serve as Judges of the Supreme Court of Justice of El Salvador (1994)
 Miriam Geraldine Aldana Revelo: First (female) Judge of the Courts of Extinction of Domain (2004)
 Carmen Elena Rivas Landaverde: First female to serve as the President of the Court of Accounts of the Republic of El Salvador (c. 2018)

Greenland (DNK) 

 Agnete Weis Bentzon: First female lawyer to perform a legal expedition in Greenland (the result of which led to the creation of a criminal law system in Greenland). She served as a judge in Greenland from 1963 to 1964. Prior to the expedition, she had the distinction of being Denmark's first female professor of law.
Vera Leth: First Greenlandic female lawyer (1988). She is also the female to serve as the County Council Ombudsman for the Parliament of Greenland (1997).
Birgit Skriver: First female to serve as a Judge of the Court of Greenland (2011; court created in 2010)

Grenada 

 Monica Theresa Joseph: First female appointed as a Justice of the Eastern Caribbean Supreme Court (1982)
 Velma L. Hylton (1967): First female to serve as the Director of Public Prosecutions in Grenada (1984)
Charmaine Pemberton: First female judge in Grenada (2003)
Nicole Sylvester: First female to serve as the President of the Organization of Eastern Caribbean States (OECS) Bar Association (c. 2007)
 Celia Edwards: First female lawyer to become a Queen's Counsel (QC) in Grenada (2008)
 Janice Pereira (British Virgin Islands, 1981): First female (and British Virgin Islander) justice appointed as the Chief Justice of the Eastern Caribbean Supreme Court (2012)
Dia Forrester: First female to serve as the Attorney General of Grenada (2021)

Guadeloupe (FRA) 

Gerty Archimede (1939): First female lawyer in Guadeloupe and the rest of the French West Indies (Martinique, Saint Barthélemy and Saint Martin). She was also the first female to serve as President of the Bar of Guadeloupe. 
Christine Penichon: First female to serve as the Attorney General at the Court of Appeal of Basse-Terre in Guadeloupe (2008) 
Sylvie Favier: First female to serve as the President of the Administrative Courts of Basse-Terre, Saint Barthélemy and Saint Martin (2010) 
Élodie Rouchouse: First female to serve as the Advocate General at the Court of Appeal of Basse-Terre in Guadeloupe (2020)

Guatemala 

 Luz Castillo Díaz-Ordaz de Villagrán: First female to graduate as a lawyer in Guatemala (1927), though she could not exercise the profession until the 1940s
 Graciela Quan (1942): First female lawyer in Guatemala
 Ana Maria Rosa Vargas de Ortiz: First female judge in Guatemala (1960)
María Luisa Beltranena de Padilla: First female to serve as a Magistrate and the President (Post-Serranazo; 1993) of the Supreme Court of Guatemala  
Alma Beatriz Quiñones López: First female to serve as the President of the Constitutional Court of Guatemala (1995)
Yolanda Pérez Ruiz: First female to serve as the President of the College of Lawyers and Notaries of Guatemala (2005)
María Encarnación Mejía García de Contreras: First female to serve as the interim Attorney General of Guatemala (2010)
Claudia Paz y Paz: First female to permanently serve as the Attorney General of Guatemala (2010-2014)

Haiti 

 Georgette Justin (1933): First female lawyer in Haiti 
Ertha Pascal-Trouillot (1971): First female judge in Haiti (upon her appointment as a Judge of the Court of First Instance in 1979). She was also the first female appointed as a Justice of the Supreme Court of Haiti (or Court of Cassation; 1988).
Nonie H. Mathieu: First female to serve as the President of the Superior Court of Auditors and Administrative Disputes of Haiti (2009)
Marie Suzy Legros: First female elected to serve as a Bâtonnière (l’ordre des avocats de Port-au-Prince) in Haiti (2020)

Honduras 

 Alba Alonso de Quesada: First female lawyer in Honduras
Georgina Bustillo-Rivera: First female to become a Judge of Letters in Honduras (1957)
 Edith Rivera de López Castro (1969): First female to serve as a Judge of the Supreme Court of Justice of Honduras (1983-1986)
Vilma Cecilia Morales Montalván: First female judge to serve as the President of the Supreme Court of Justice of Honduras (2002-2009)
Anny Belinda Ochoa: First female to serve as the President of the Honduran Bar Association (2018)

Jamaica 

 Lily Tai Ten Quee (1934): First female Chinese barrister in Jamaica 
 Daisy Lucille Chambers (1948): First female lawyer in Jamaica 
 Ena Joyce Collymore-Woodstock (1947; Bar's Gray Inn, England): First female judge in Jamaica (upon her appointment as the Resident Magistrate in 1959). She was also the first female appointed as the Clerk of the Courts (1950). 
 Shirley Miller: First female Queen's Counsel (QC) in Jamaica (1971) 
 Ena Blanche Allen (1953): First female in Jamaica appointed as a Puisne Justice for the Supreme Court (1975)
 Marjory "Madge" Morgan (1961): First female Judge of the Court of Appeal in Jamaica (1988)
 Paula Llewellyn: First female to serve as the Director of Public Prosecutions (1999) and Senior Deputy Director of Public Prosecutions (2003) in Jamaica 
 Hilary Phillips: First female to serve as the President of the Jamaican Bar Association (2001)
 Zaila McCalla (1976): First female justice appointed as the Chief Justice of Jamaica (2007)
 Margarette May Macaulay: First Jamaican female to serve as a Judge of the Inter-American Court of Human Rights (2007)
 Dorothy Lightbourne: First female appointed as the Attorney General of Jamaica (2007-2011)
 Arlene Harrison Henry (1978): First female appointed as the Public Defender of Jamaica (2015)
 Nicole Foster-Pusey (1993): First female appointed as the Solicitor-General of Jamaica (2012)

Martinique (FRA) 

Gerty Archimede (1939): First female lawyer in the French West Indies (Guadeloupe, Martinique, Saint Barthélemy and Saint Martin)
Andrée Pierre-Rose Bocaly (1945): First female lawyer to actually practice in Martinique
Thérèse Yoyo-Likao: First female elected as the Bâtonnière du Barreau de la Martinique (1979)
Dolor Emmanuel Émile: First female judge in Martinique
Clarisse Taron: First female to serve as a public prosecutor in Martinique (2021)
Hélène Rouland-Boyer: First female to serve as the President of the Administrative Courts of Martinique and Saint Pierre and Miquelon (2022)

Mexico 

 María Asunción Sandoval de Zarco (1898): First female lawyer in Mexico
Guadalupe Zuñiga de González: First female appointed as a Judge of the Juvenile Court in Mexico (1926)
Esperanza Velázquez Bringas: First female magistrate of the Superior Court of Justice of the Federal District of Mexico (1929)
 Remedios Albertina Ezeta Uribe (1933): First female judge (civil and criminal) in Mexico (c. 1940s)
 María Lavalle Urbina (1944): First female appointed as a Judge of the Superior Court of the District and Federal Territories (1947). She later became the first female President of the Senate of Mexico.
Dolores Hedúan Virués: First female appointed as a Magistrate of the Tax Court of the Federation (1947)
 María Cristina Salmorán de Tamayo: First female appointed as the Minister (Judge) of the Supreme Court of Justice of the Nation of Mexico (1961)
Jiménez Trava: First female to serve as the President of a Superior Court of Justice in Mexico (1971-1976)
 Luz María Perdomo Juvera: First female appointed as a federal judge (1974)
 María del Carmen Alanís Figueroa: First female to serve as President of the Electoral Tribunal of the Federation of Mexico (2007)
 Marisela Morales: First female appointed as the Attorney General of Mexico (2011)
Claudia Elena de Buen Unna: First female to serve as the vice-president (2019) and President (2021) of the Mexican Bar Association, B.C. (Barra Mexicana, Colegio De Abogados, A.C.)
Socorro Flores Liera: First Mexican (female) to serve as a Judge of the International Criminal Court (2021)
Norma Lucía Piña Hernández: First female to serve as the Chief Justice of the Supreme Court of Justice of the Nation of Mexico (2023)

Montserrat (GBR) 
Elizabeth Constance Griffin (1969): First female lawyer in MontserratMonica Theresa Joseph: First female appointed as a Justice of the Eastern Caribbean Supreme Court (1982)Gertel Thom: First female Attorney General of Montserrat (1993-1998)Nicole Sylvester: First female to serve as the President of the Organization of Eastern Caribbean States (OECS) Bar Association (c. 2007)Kathy-Ann Pyke: First (female) Director of the Office of Public Prosecutions in Montserrat (2011)Janice Pereira (British Virgin Islands, 1981): First female (and British Virgin Islander) justice appointed as the Chief Justice of the Eastern Caribbean Supreme Court (2012)

Nicaragua 

 Olga Núñez de Saballos (née Abaunza) (1945): First female lawyer in Nicaragua. She was also the first female to earn a law degree in Nicaragua.
 Catalina Rojas and Joaquina Vega: First female judges in Nicaragua (1948-1949) 
Vilma Núñez de Escorcia: First female to serve as a Judge and Vice-President of the Supreme Court of Nicaragua (1979)
 Ana Julia Guido Ochoa: First female appointed as the Attorney General of Nicaragua (2014)
Doña Alba Luz Ramos: First female judge to serve as the President of the Supreme Court of Nicaragua (2017)

Panama 

 Clara Gonzalez (1925): First female lawyer in Panama. She later became the first female Judge of the Juvenile Justice Court when it was created in 1951. 
 Alma Montenegro de Fletcher: First female to serve as a notary public and prosecutor in Panama 
 Marisol Reyes de Vásquez (c. 1958): First female justice appointed as President of the Supreme Court of Justice of Panama (1985) 
 Graciela Dixon: First Black female justice appointed as the President of the Supreme Court of Justice of Panama (2005)
Ana Matilde Gómez: First female to serve as the Attorney General of Panama (2005)

Puerto Rico (USA) 
See List of first women lawyers and judges in the Territories of the U.S.

Saba (NLD) 

Dorothée de Sampayo: First female Magistrate of the Court of Justice of the Netherlands Antilles (1982-1986). She later became the first female Registrar of the International Criminal Tribunal for the former Yugoslavia. [Saba]
Lisbeth Hoefdraad: First female appointed as the President of the Common Court of Justice of the Antilles and Aruba (2007-2013) [now called the Joint Court of Justice of Aruba, Curaçao, Sint Maarten, and of Bonaire, Sint Eustatius and Saba]

Saint Barthélemy (FRA) 

Gerty Archimede (1939): First female lawyer in the French West Indies (Guadeloupe, Martinique, Saint Barthélemy and Saint Martin)
Sylvie Favier: First female to serve as the President of the Administrative Courts of Basse-Terre, Saint Barthélemy and Saint Martin (2010)

Saint Kitts and Nevis 

 Arlene Magdalene Fraites-Gomez (1962): First female lawyer called to the Bar of Saint Kitts and Nevis (then "St. Kitts, Nevis and Anguilla"); also called to the Bar of Antigua and Barbuda and to the Bar of England and Wales (1962)
 Monica Theresa Joseph: First female appointed as a Justice of the Eastern Caribbean Supreme Court (1982) 
 Velma L. Hylton (1967): First female assigned as a puisne judge in Saint Kitts and Nevis (1992) 
Ianthea Leigertwood-Octave: First female to serve as the Resident Judge of Saint Kitts and Nevis (2005) 
Nicole Sylvester: First female to serve as the President of the Organization of Eastern Caribbean States (OECS) Bar Association (c. 2007) 
 Janice Pereira (British Virgin Islands, 1981): First female (and British Virgin Islander) justice appointed as the Chief Justice of the Eastern Caribbean Supreme Court (2012)

Saint Lucia 

Marie Grace Augustin, a St. Lucian who studied law, was on the verge of becoming the first female lawyer in the Commonwealth Caribbean in 1923. Augustin was denied the ability to take the bar exam that year, however, and so she entered the business industry instead.
Daisy Borman (c. 1940s): First female to practice law in Saint Lucia
 Suzie d'Auvergne (c. 1975): First female judge in Saint Lucia (upon her appointment as a High Court Judge of the Eastern Caribbean Supreme Court in 1990). She was also Saint Lucia's first female Solicitor General and Director of Public Prosecutions.
 Monica Theresa Joseph: First female appointed as a Justice of the Eastern Caribbean Supreme Court (1982)
 Lorraine Williams: First female to serve as the President of the Saint Lucia Bar Association (2001)
 Nicole Sylvester: First female to serve as the President of the Organization of Eastern Caribbean States (OECS) Bar Association (c. 2007)

Saint Martin (FRA) 

Gerty Archimede (1939): First female lawyer in the French West Indies (Guadeloupe, Martinique, Saint Barthélemy and Saint Martin)
Annie Magnan: First female lawyer in Saint Martin. She was also the first female to serve as President of the Saint Martin Bar Association.  
Sylvie Favier: First female to serve as the President of the Administrative Courts of Basse-Terre, Saint Barthélemy and Saint Martin (2010)

Saint Pierre and Miquelon (FRA) 

Jade Reux (2017): First female student lawyer sworn in the Superior Court of Appeal of Saint-Pierre and Miquelon [Saint-Pierre and Miquelon]
Valérie Lebreton: First female appointed as the President of the Court of Appeal of Saint-Pierre (2017) [Saint-Pierre and Miquelon]
Caroline Gaussen-Calbo: First female to serve as the Public Prosecutor of the Tribunal de Grande of Saint-Pierre and Miquelon (2019)
Hélène Rouland-Boyer: First female to serve as the President of the Administrative Courts of Martinique and Saint Pierre and Miquelon (2022)

Saint Vincent and the Grenadines 

 Sylvia Judith Bertrand (Admitted to Dominica Bar in 1969): First female judge in Saint Vincent and the Grenadines (1984) 
 Monica Theresa Joseph: First female appointed as a Justice of the Eastern Caribbean Supreme Court (1982)
 Judith Jones-Morgan (c. 1990s): First female appointed as the Attorney General of Saint Vincent and the Grenadines (2001)
 Nicole Sylvester: First female to serve as the President of the Organization of Eastern Caribbean States (OECS) Bar Association (c. 2007)
 Sejilla McDowall: First female appointed as the Director of Public Prosecutions in Saint Vincent and the Grenadines (2020)

Sint Eustatius (NLD) 

Dorothée de Sampayo: First female Magistrate of the Court of Justice of the Netherlands Antilles (1982-1986). She later became the first female Registrar of the International Criminal Tribunal for the former Yugoslavia. [Sint Eustatius]
Lisbeth Hoefdraad: First female appointed as the President of the Common Court of Justice of the Antilles and Aruba (2007-2013) [now called the Joint Court of Justice of Aruba, Curaçao, Sint Maarten, and of Bonaire, Sint Eustatius and Saba]
 Gisèle Veen-Jonkhout: First female Public Prosecutor of the Netherlands Antilles (2010)

Sint Maarten (NLD) 

Dorothée de Sampayo: First female Magistrate of the Court of Justice of the Netherlands Antilles (1982-1986). She later became the first female Registrar of the International Criminal Tribunal for the former Yugoslavia. [Sint Maarten]
 Lisbeth Hoefdraad: First female appointed as the President of the Common Court of Justice of the Antilles and Aruba (2007-2013) [now called the Joint Court of Justice of Aruba, Curaçao, Sint Maarten, and of Bonaire, Sint Eustatius and Saba]
Gisèle Veen-Jonkhout: First female Public Prosecutor of the Netherlands Antilles (2010)
Suzanne Camelia-Römer: First female to serve as an alternate member of the Constitutional Court of Sint Maarten (2010)

Trinidad and Tobago 

 Gladys Eileen Ramsaran (1932): First female lawyer in Trinidad and Tobago
 Mona Rigsby James (1939): First native-born female lawyer in Trinidad and Tobago
 Jean A. Permanand (1962): First female appointed as a Judge of the Appeal Court of Trinidad and Tobago (1993-2004).She was also the first female lawyer to become the Solicitor General in Trinidad and Tobago in the 1980s. 
 Occah Seepaul (1964): First female appointed as the Master of the High Court of Trinidad and Tobago (1986-1993)
 Gladys Seedansingh Gafoor (1962): First female to serve as the Director of Public Prosecutions in Trinidad and Tobago (c. 1987) 
 Wendy Punnett-Hope: First female appointed as the Acting Deputy Registrar of the Supreme Court of Trinidad and Tobago (1970-1977). Brenda Paray-Durity later became the first permanent female Registrar.
 Marie Elizabeth Bourne-Hollands: First female judge in Trinidad and Tobago (upon her appointment as a Judge of the High Court of Trinidad and Tobago in 1972). She was also the first female lawyer in Barbados. 
 Monica Barnes: First female from Trinidad and Tobago to be admitted to the Inner Bar and made a Senior Counsel (1979) 
 Kamla Persad-Bissessar (1985): First female lawyer to become the Attorney General of Trinidad and Tobago (1995)
 Morean Phillip: First female appointed as the President of the Law Association of Trinidad and Tobago (1989) 
 Maureen Rajnauth-Lee: First female citizen of Trinidad and Tobago appointed as a Judge of the Caribbean Court of Justice (2015)
 Marcia Ayers-Caesar: First female to serve as the Chief Magistrate of the High Court of Trinidad and Tobago (2017)

Turks and Caicos Islands (GBR) 

 Shirley D. Simmons (1980): First female (a Bermudian) admitted to the Turks and Caicos Islands Bar Association 
 Margaret Ramsay-Hale (1991): First female appointed as a Justice of the Supreme Court of the Turks and Caicos Islands (2011) and serve as its Chief Justice (2014)
 Lisa Agard: First female Senior Counsel to work for the Attorney General's Office of the Turks and Caicos Islands (c. 1987)
 Sarah Knight (1998): First Turks and Caicos Islander female admitted to the Turks and Caicos Islands Bar Association. She later served as the association's president.
 Rhondalee Braithwaite-Knowles: First Turks and Caicos Islander female to become a Deputy Attorney General (2008) and Attorney General of Turks and Caicos Islands (2014). She later became the first female Queen's Counsel (QC) in the Turks and Caicos Islands. 
 JoAnn Meloche: First (female) Director of Public Prosecutions in the Turks and Caicos Islands (2013) 
 Oreika Selver-Gardiner: First local female attorney to serve as a magistrate in the Turks and Caicos Islands (2020)

United States 
See List of first women lawyers and judges in the United States

United States Virgin Islands (USA) 
See List of first women lawyers and judges in the Territories of the U.S. for more details.

See also 

Justice ministry
List of first women lawyers and judges by nationality
 List of first women lawyers and judges in Africa
 List of first women lawyers and judges in Asia
List of first women lawyers and judges in Europe
List of first women lawyers and judges in Oceania
 List of first women lawyers and judges in South America
 List of first women lawyers and judges in the United States
List of the first women holders of political offices in North and Central America and the Caribbean

References

Women, North America, first
Lawyers, North America, first
Women, lawyers, first
Women in North America
Law in North America
Women in law